Charles Stewart Wurts (1790–1859) was a founder of the Delaware and Hudson Canal Company, which built the Delaware and Hudson Canal and later became the Delaware and Hudson Railway. Along with his brothers, he helped launch the anthracite industry in America.

Born in Flanders, New Jersey, he was a son of John Wurts (1744–1793) and Sarah Grandin; and a grandson of Johannes Conrad Wirz (1706–1763), who founded the Wurts family in America.

In 1823, he helped found the Delaware and Hudson Canal Company along with his brothers William (1788–1858), Maurice (1783–1854), and John Wurts (1792–1861).

Charles married Mary Van Uxem (1802–1877) in 1828; among their children was Charles Stewart Wurts II (1830–??), who married Mary S. Wood (??-1883).

He died in 1859 and was interred at Laurel Hill Cemetery in Philadelphia.

Citations

1790 births
1859 deaths
Burials at Laurel Hill Cemetery (Philadelphia)
Businesspeople from New Jersey
People from Mount Olive Township, New Jersey
19th-century American businesspeople